Walter Herbert Withers (22 October 1854 – 13 October 1914) was an English-born Australian landscape artist and a member of the Heidelberg School of Australian impressionists.

Biography 
Withers was born at Handsworth, Staffordshire, the son of Edwin Withers. He showed an early desire to paint, but objection was made to this by his father. It is not known what occupation he followed in England, his father objected to his becoming a professional painter.

In 1882 he arrived in Australia with the intention of working on a farm. After working for about 18 months on a farm, Withers removed to Melbourne and obtained a position as draughtsman in a firm of printers. During the period of his black and white work, Withers executed, in chalk, portraits for reproduction, that of the Count von Bismark being an especially fine example of his work in this direction. In his spare time Withers sought to cultivate his art, and eventually had work accepted for exhibition in the Old Academy, Melbourne.

In 1887 Withers went to Europe, and there he married Fanny Flinn in October of that year. He and his wife settled in a small flat in Paris and he studied for some months at the Académie Julian.

He returned to Australia with his wife in June 1888 having been commissioned to do black and white work for Messrs Fergusson and Mitchell of Melbourne. His most important work in this way will be found in the illustrations to Edmund Finn's, The Chronicles of Early Melbourne.

Withers settled down at first at Kew, a suburb of Melbourne, and then in Eaglemont on the other side of the river Yarra. He became friendly with Arthur Streeton, Charles Conder, Tom Roberts, Frederick McCubbin and other leading artists of the period. He began to sell a few pictures, but the collapse of the land boom put an end to his illustrative work. In 1890 Withers and his family moved into Charterisville Estate in East Ivanhoe. In 1903 they moved for the last time to Eltham, to a timber house on the corner of Bolton and Brougham Streets.  Here, Withers added a studio, where he painted many works featuring the local landscape.

Influence 
Withers's influence as a painter, upon younger art students of his time, was marked. He obtained some work as a drawing and painting master in schools, and amongst those who were his pupils were Percy Lindsay, and his younger brother Norman Lindsay.

In 1891, he opened a studio in Collins Street West, where he held his first private exhibition. From 1894 Withers spent the next four years in a cottage in Cape Street, Heidelberg, Victoria. It was here that he painted some of his finest work, of the fin de siècle period. In 1894 his masterpiece, Tranquil Winter, was exhibited at the Victorian Artists Society exhibition and bought by the trustees of the National Gallery of Victoria. The Selector's Home, painted in 1895, was an achievement that won the admiration of Arthur Streeton and Fred McCubbin.

He settled down to a steady career of painting though not at first successful commercially. In 1897 he was awarded the first Wynne Prize at Sydney for his picture, The Storm, which was in the same year purchased for the National Gallery of New South Wales. He was elected to the council of the Victorian Artists Society in 1889, and in 1905 held the office of president for a year. His health was deteriorating towards the end of his life but he continued to do a large amount of painting both in oils and in watercolours. After his death his work was successful in exhibitions at Sedon Galleries, where on one occasion it was exhibited with the work of his son, C. Meynell Withers.

He died in Eltham, Victoria, on 13 October 1914 and was outlived by his wife and four children, including Margery Withers, who was also a painter. He was buried at the Anglican Church of Saint Helena.

Gallery

Notes

External links
Withers, Walter Herbert (1854–1914) at the Dictionary of Australian Biography
Walter Withers at the Artist's Footsteps
The Drover at Culture Victoria
Tranquil Winter at the National Gallery of Victoria

See also
Visual arts of Australia

1854 births
1914 deaths
Landscape artists
Heidelberg School
Académie Julian alumni
People from Handsworth, West Midlands
Wynne Prize winners
19th-century Australian painters
19th-century Australian male artists
20th-century Australian painters
20th-century Australian male artists
Australian landscape painters
Australian male painters
English emigrants to colonial Australia
Artists from Melbourne
People from Heidelberg, Victoria
National Gallery of Victoria Art School alumni